Jacob Berkshire Meyers (born June 18, 1996) is an American professional baseball outfielder for the Houston Astros of Major League Baseball (MLB). Meyers played college baseball for the Nebraska Cornhuskers. He was selected in the 13th round by the Astros in the 2017 MLB draft. He made his MLB debut in 2021.

Early life and amateur career
Jacob Berkshire Meyers was born to Paul and Laurie Meyers on June 18, 1996 in Omaha, Nebraska. Paul was selected by the San Francisco Giants in the fourth round of the 1986 draft and spent multiple seasons playing Minor League Baseball but never made it to the majors. Meyers has one sister, Lauren. He attended Westside High School, where he played baseball and basketball. Westside's baseball team won the Class A state championship in Meyers' junior and senior seasons, while the basketball team finished runner-up in the Class A state championship in Meyers' senior year. As a senior, Meyers was named the captain of both the Omaha World-Herald All-Nebraska baseball team and the Lincoln Journal Star Super State baseball team after pitching to a 9–0 win-loss record with a 0.97 earned run average (ERA) and 80 strikeouts in 58 innings pitched while also batting .440 with six triples, 51 runs scored, and 23 runs batted in (RBIs).

Meyers attended the University of Nebraska–Lincoln as a business administration major, where he played college baseball for the Nebraska Cornhuskers as both a pitcher and an outfielder. Jake's father, Paul, also attended Nebraska and was an All-American centerfielder in 1986. Jake went 3–1 with a 2.38 ERA in 16 appearances as a pitcher in his freshman season. As a sophomore, Meyers was named third team All-Big Ten Conference after leading the team with a .326 batting average and with a 1.42 ERA. He was named first team All-Big Ten and a third team All-American by Baseball America and the NCBWA after hitting .297 with one home run, seven doubles, 16 RBIs, 52 runs scored, and 20 stolen bases while also going 8–2 on the mound with a 3.42 ERA in 84.1 innings pitched.

Professional career

2017—2020

The Houston Astros selected Meyers in the 13th round of the 2017 Major League Baseball draft. After signing with the team he was assigned to the Tri-City ValleyCats. Meyers was assigned to the Class A Quad Cities River Bandits to start the 2018 season before being promoted to the Buies Creek Astros of the Class A-Advanced Carolina League.

He returned to the Carolina League with the renamed Fayetteville Woodpeckers at the beginning of the 2019 season, where hit batted .258 with eight home runs and 41 RBIs and was named a Mid-Season All-Star before being promoted to the Double-A Corpus Christi Hooks. He was a non-roster invitee for the Astros in spring training in 2020 before it, and later the minor league season, were canceled due to the COVID-19 pandemic.

2021
He opened the 2021 season with the Sugar Land Skeeters. On July 31, 2021, Houston selected Meyers' contract and promoted him to the active roster.  Having traded regular center fielder Myles Straw to the Cleveland Indians, the Astros gave Meyers and fellow rookie Chas McCormick the opportunity to play more. Meyers made his Major League debut on August 1 as a pinch hitter in the ninth inning of a 5–3 loss to the San Francisco Giants.  Meyers hit his first career home run on August 14, against Los Angeles Angels' pitcher Jaime Barría, and hit a grand slam later in the same game as the Astros won, 8–2.  On August 25, Meyers won the YouTube Game of the Week MVP for knocking in the winning run against the Kansas City Royals.

In the 2021 regular season, Meyers appeared in 49 total games and took 163 plate appearances.  He batted .260/.323/.438 with six home runs and 28 RBI, 10 bases on balls (BB) and 50 strikeouts.  He appeared in 39 games in center field, four in left field, and three in right right field.  His play was credited with +4 total Defensive Runs Saved (DRS) while he recording one outfield assist and one error.  In Game 4 of the American League Division Series (ALDS) versus the Chicago White Sox, Meyers sustained an injury to his left shoulder while attempting to catch a home run ball hit by Gavin Sheets.  He was unable to play in the remainder of the Astros' World Series run.  On November 10, he underwent surgery to repair the torn labrum in the left shoulder, which was anticipated to delay his start to the 2022 season.

2022
On June 24, 2022, the club activated Meyers from the 60-day injured list.  He hit a three-run home run versus Michael Lorenzen on July 1 to help spark a 5–1 win versus the Los Angeles Angels.  

For the 2022 regular season, Meyers batted .227/.269/.313 in 150 at bats with one home run, 15 RBIs, and two stolen bases over 52 games with the major league club.  He made 51 defensive appearances, all in center field.  His eight total zone runs ranked fourth at his position in the AL.

In Game 1 of the 2022 ALDS, Meyers appeared as a pinch runner in the ninth inning and scored the lead run on a Yordan Álvarez three-run walk-off home run, for an 8–7 final over the Seattle Mariners.  It was the first walk-off home run in an MLB postseason contest with the home team down to their final out in the ninth inning and trailing by more than one run.

Personal life
Meyers began dating Maddie Lammel, a childhood family friend, in 2015, and the couple married in December 2021. In December 2022, they welcomed their daughter, Ava. The family resides in Nebraska during the off-season, where Maddie is a second grade teacher.

References

External links

Nebraska Cornhuskers bio

1996 births
Living people
Sportspeople from Omaha, Nebraska
Baseball players from Nebraska
Major League Baseball outfielders
Houston Astros players
Nebraska Cornhuskers baseball players
Tri-City ValleyCats players
Quad Cities River Bandits players
Buies Creek Astros players
Fayetteville Woodpeckers players
Corpus Christi Hooks players
Sugar Land Skeeters players
Sugar Land Space Cowboys players